Davide Bassi (born 12 April 1985) is an Italian footballer who plays as a goalkeeper.

Club career
Born in Sarzana, Liguria, Bassi was a product of Empoli's youth system, joining the team in 2002, but started his professional career at Tuscan club Massese in 2003. In 2005, he returned to Empoli in a co-ownership deal. Bassi formally returned to Empoli on 1 July 2006. He became the team's first choice goalkeeper, ahead Daniele Balli, during the second half of the 2007–08 Serie A season. After the team were relegated, he remained as the first choice keeper. During the 2010–11 Serie B season, he left for Torino, to replace the recently departed Matteo Sereni. Empoli signed Jasmin Handanović to replace Bassi.

In July 2011, he left on loan for as  Sassuolo, but served as an understudy to Alberto Pomini.

In July 2013, Bassi changed his shirt number to no.28. He was the team's first choice goalkeeper during the 2013–14 Serie B season. However, the next year, he was a backup to Luigi Sepe during the 2014–15 Serie A season.

Atalanta
On 27 June 2015, Bassi signed a 2-year contract with Serie A club Atalanta B.C. on a free transfer.

In January 2017, Bassi was released.

Parma
On 1 March 2017, Bassi was signed by Lega Pro club Parma on a free transfer, as an emergency signing to replace injured Pierluigi Frattali. However, on 3 April he was released again, due to the recovery of Frattali, as well as Parma ran out of quota to keep in their 25-men squad list. Bassi was the starting keeper for the Emilian club in March, with 1 win, 2 draws and 1 loss, conceding 4 goals. The match played on 2 April, Bassi was the backup of Frattali.

Spezia
Bassi joined Spezia on 10 July 2017.

International career
Bassi was never capped for Italy at international level until the 2008 Toulon Tournament. The coach rested the regular starters of the under-21 team, and instead picked Bassi and Enrico Alfonso. They both shared the first choice goalkeeping role, as Italy went on to win the tournament. However, despite his success, Bassi did not go on to represent the under-23 side at the Beijing Olympics that summer.

Honours
Individual
Toulon Tournament Best Goalkeeper: 2008

References

External links
 
 FIGC 
 Lega Serie A profile 
 Lega Serie B profile 

Italian footballers
Italy under-21 international footballers
Serie A players
Serie B players
Empoli F.C. players
U.S. Massese 1919 players
Torino F.C. players
U.S. Sassuolo Calcio players
Spezia Calcio players
Association football goalkeepers
People from Sarzana
Footballers from Liguria
1985 births
Living people
Sportspeople from the Province of La Spezia